Ali Güzeldal (born 10 April 1986) is a former Turkish professional footballer and currently the manager of the U14 squad at İstanbul Başakşehir. He played as an attacking midfielder.

References

External links
Coach profile at TFF

1988 births
Living people
Turkish footballers
Turkey B international footballers
Turkey under-21 international footballers
Turkey youth international footballers
Trabzonspor footballers
Akçaabat Sebatspor footballers
İstanbul Başakşehir F.K. players
Süper Lig players
TFF First League players

Association football midfielders